Mountain High... Valley Low is the sixth studio album by American singer Yolanda Adams. It was released by Elektra Records on September 21, 1999 in the United States. The album stands as Adams's best-selling to date, having sold more than 2,374,000 copies and being certified platinum by the Recording Industry Association of America (RIAA). The album won the Grammy Award for Best Contemporary Soul Gospel Album.

Several singles were released from Mountain High... Valley Low. The set leads with the Warryn Campbell-produced "Yeah", which was co-written by gospel duo Mary Mary who springboarded from the song to gain their own fame. The most notable single was the second release, "Open My Heart," which became a massive crossover fixture on R&B radio. Both of the singles had accompanying music videos. Remixers like Maurice Joshua, Digital Black-N-Groove, Pound Boys, and Junior Vasquez were brought in to turn both of these songs into dance club-friendly material. "The Things We Do" and "Fragile Heart" were also serviced to radio and fared well on adult contemporary stations.

Track listing
Credits taken from the album's liner notes.

Notes
  denotes co-producer

Personnel

Unless otherwise noted, information for personnel is taken from Discogs.

"Time to Change"
Produced by Warryn Campbell
Lead & Background Vocals: Yolanda Adams
Background Vocals: Mary Mary
All (Instrumental) Music performed by Warryn Campbell

"Yeah"
Produced by Warryn Campbell
Lead Vocals: Yolanda Adams
Background Vocals: Mary Mary
Guitar: Dave Foreman
All Other Music performed by Warryn Campbell

"Fragile Heart"
Produced by Buster & Shavoni: Louis Brown & Scott "Shavoni" Parker
Lead Vocals: Yolanda Adams
Background Vocals: Vanessa Williams, Raymond Reeder & Victoria Purcell
Piano Solo & All Pianos: Tim Carmon
Additional String Overdubs: Rickey Grundy
All Other Music performed by Buster & Shavoni

"That Name"
Produced by Richard Smallwood
Lead Vocals: Yolanda Adams
Background Vocals: Richard Smallwood & Vision
Music performed by Richard Smallwood, Bryant Pugh, Darin Atwater, Mark A. Walker & Roger Ryan

"In The Midst of It All"
Produced by Kevin Bond
Live Drums: Jeremy Haynes
All Other Instruments played & arranged by Kevin Bond
Originally performed by Walter Hawkins & The Hawkins Family

"The Things We Do"
Produced by Keith Thomas
Music & Strings arranged by Keith Thomas
Strings arranged & conducted by Ronn Huff
Strings performed by Nashville String Machine
Acoustic Guitar: Bruce Gaitsch
Keyboards, Bass & Drum Machine played by Keith Thomas
Additional Drum Machine: Mark Hammond
Additional Background Vocals: Debbie Winans
Vocal Samples: "Inaugural Address" by John F. Kennedy & "I Have a Dream (Detroit)" by Martin Luther King Jr.

"Open My Heart"
Produced by Jimmy Jam and Terry Lewis & James "Big Jim" Wright
Percussion & Live Drums: Stokley Williams
Guitar: Mike Scott
Strings arranged by Lee Blaske & Big Jim Wright
Violins: Brenda Mickens, Carolyn Daws, Elizabeth Sobieski, Michael Sobieski, Elsa Nilsson, Leslie Shank & Thomas Kornacker
Violas: Alice Preves & Tamas Strasser
All Other Instruments played by Big Jim Wright
Background Vocals: Marva King & Yolanda Adams

"Wherever You Are"
Produced by Jimmy Jam and Terry Lewis & James "Big Jim" Wright
Background Vocals: Big Jim Wright & Yolanda Adams
Keyboards: Big Jim Wright & Jimmy Jam
Bass played by Jimmy Jam
Percussion: Terry Lewis
Guitar: Mike Scott
All Other Instruments played by Big Jim Wright
Re-Sung Lyrics from "I Wanna Be Where You Are" by Michael Jackson

"He'll Arrive (Coming Back)"
Produced by Walter "Little Walt" Millsap III
Lead & Background Vocals: Kelly Price & Yolanda Adams
Background Vocals: Candice Nelson
All Music performed by Walter "Lil Walt" Millsap III

"Continual Praise"
Produced by Fred Hammond
Keyboards & Drum Machine: Tommie Walker
Lead Guitar & Live Bass played by Fred Hammond
Vocals arranged by Fred Hammond
Background Vocals performed by JoAnn Rosario, Bryan Pratt, David Ivey, Frederick J. Purifoy II, Kevin L. Wilson, Marsha Johns, Miatura Dias, Pam Kenyon M. Donald, Tamika Lucas & Yoshawndala Parker.

"Already Alright"
Produced by Jimmy Jam and Terry Lewis & James "Big Jim" Wright
Background Vocals: Big Jim Wright, Marva King & Yolanda Adams
Drum Machine: Alex Richbourg
Keyboards: Big Jim Wright
All Other Instruments played by Jimmy Jam and Terry Lewis

Charts

Weekly charts

Year-end charts

Certifications

References

External links
 

1999 albums
Albums produced by Jimmy Jam and Terry Lewis
Albums produced by Warryn Campbell
Yolanda Adams albums
Elektra Records albums